Zulma P. Lopez (born May 2, 1977) is an American politician from the state of Georgia. A Democrat, Lopez has represented the 86th District of the Georgia House of Representatives, which encompasses a part of metro Atlanta, since January 2021. On February 4, 2022, Lopez announced she would not be seeking re-election in the Georgia House of Representatives.

Early life 
Lopez was born and raised in Puerto Rico. She graduated from the University of Puerto Rico with a B. A. in 1999, and with her J.D. from the University of Puerto Rico School of Law in 2003. Lopez moved to Georgia in 2007. She has owned her own law practice, Lopez Immigration LLC, since 2014.

Political career 
In 2019, Lopez announced that she would run for the 86th District of the Georgia House of Representatives against the incumbent representative, Michelle Henson in the primary. Lopez defeated Henson in a runoff election on August 20, 2020. She ran unopposed in the General election.

Georgia House of Representatives 
Lopez is currently serving on the Economic Development & Tourism Committee, the Judiciary Non-Civil Committee, and the Science and Technology Committee

Personal life 
Lopez is married to DeKalb County State Court Judge Dax Eric López. They have four children.

References

American politicians of Puerto Rican descent
Democratic Party members of the Georgia House of Representatives
21st-century American politicians
Hispanic and Latino American state legislators in Georgia (U.S. state)
Hispanic and Latino American women in politics
Living people
21st-century American women politicians
University of Puerto Rico alumni
Women state legislators in Georgia (U.S. state)
1978 births